The House at 9 White Avenue in Wakefield, Massachusetts is a well-preserved transitional Queen Anne/Colonial Revival house.  Built about 1903, it was listed on the National Register of Historic Places in 1989.

Description and history
White Avenue is located northeast of downtown Wakefield, and is a short street in a residential area just east of Lake Quannapowitt.  This house stands on the north side of the street, facing south on a lot that slopes west toward the lake.  It is a -story wood-frame structure, with a hip roof, with two gable-roof and clapboarded exterior.  Its roof has dormers bracketing an oriel window in front, and a normal gabled dormer to the side; these gables are decorated with jigsawn Queen Anne woodwork.  The house is three bays wide, with a center entrance sheltered by a porch supported by paired columns, with jigsawn valances.  The porch extends to an open veranda to either side.

White Avenue was originally part of a larger property owned by John Aborn, a shoemaker who lived in a house west of this one on Main Street. Aborn and his father-in-law John White owned a successful shoe factory. Aborn's heirs laid out White Avenue and adjacent Aborn Street in 1857, and the area was developed in the 1860s and 1870s as a residential area for local middle-class businessmen and tradesmen.  This house was built about 1903, and its first long-term owner was Edward Gleason, who moved here from Aborn Street.  Gleason was a prominent local landscape and portrait photographer, who also kept an office in Boston.  Gleason is credited with most of the photographs depicted in the 1893 book Wakefield; its Representative Business Men and Points of Interest.

See also
National Register of Historic Places listings in Wakefield, Massachusetts
National Register of Historic Places listings in Middlesex County, Massachusetts

References

Houses on the National Register of Historic Places in Wakefield, Massachusetts
Colonial Revival architecture in Massachusetts
Houses completed in 1903
Houses in Wakefield, Massachusetts